Aadarsham may refer to:

Aadharsam, a 1982 Indian Malayalam film
Aadarsham (1993 film), a 1993 Telugu film